Daina Barone (born 24 March 1980 in Riga) is a Latvian curler.

At the national level, she is a two-time Latvian women's champion (2017, 2018) and a mixed doubles champion (2020).

She participated in Lithuanian women's club team on 2014 and 2015 Lithuanian women's championships (those championships were held in Riga), two-time runner-up.

Teams

Women's

Mixed

Mixed doubles

References

External links

 Профиль на сайте Ассоциации кёрлинга Латвии
 
 
 
 Video: 

Living people
1980 births
Sportspeople from Riga
Latvian female curlers
Latvian curling champions
21st-century Latvian women